Crocus demirizianus is a species of flowering plant in the genus Crocus of the family Iridaceae. It is a cormous perennial native to north western Turkey.

References

demirizianus